Western High School is a high school located in Russiaville, Indiana.  The school is a part of Western School Corporation.

About
Western High School is one of 5 public high schools in Howard County: Kokomo High School, Northwestern High School, Eastern (Greentown) High School, and Taylor High School.

Western was founded in 1949 by combining three smaller school systems into one corporation, Western School Corporation. The New London Quakers, West Middleton Broncos, and Russiaville Cossacks came together and formed the Western Panthers.

Athletics
Western High School is one of the 11 schools associated with the Hoosier Athletic Conference.

Currently, the teams are as follows:
Boys- Football, Soccer, Cross Country, Basketball, Wrestling, Swimming, Track and Field, Golf, and Baseball.
Girls- Volleyball, Cross Country, Basketball, Swimming, Track and Field, Softball, Golf, and Soccer.
In addition, there was a club bowling team added in 2010, however its events do not count towards conference standings since not all of the other schools have a team.

Team state championships
The following teams have taken IHSAA state championships:
2002 - Girls Golf
2012 - Baseball (3A)
2014 - Girls Basketball (3A)
2019 - Wrestling (2A)

Band program
The Western High School Marching Panthers have been ISSMA Class C State Champions in 1982, 1983, 1984, 1985, 1990, 1991, 1996, 2008, 2009, 2010, 2011, 2012, 2014, 2015, 2016, 2019 and 2021 and Class B State Champions in 1988 for a total of 18 State Championships.

Extracurricular activities
Western High School is host to FIRST Robotics Competition Team 292.

Ryan White incident
Western School Corporation gained notoriety for expelling Ryan White in 1984 because of his diagnosis of HIV, a disease that, at the time, was just coming into the national spotlight.

Notable alumni
 Ezra Hendrickson - Former MLS player for the New York Metrostars, Los Angeles Galaxy, Dallas Burn, D.C. United, Chivas USA and Columbus Crew. Hendrickson has also had an accomplished international career playing for the Saint Vincent and the Grenadines national football team.
 Ryan White - Famous AIDS victim
 Krystal Scott (Omegle Cat Killer) - Former student arrested for federal animal cruelty charges after a large internet search.

See also
 List of high schools in Indiana

References

External links
Western High School website
Athletic website

Public high schools in Indiana
Educational institutions established in 1949
Schools in Howard County, Indiana
1949 establishments in Indiana